Sayyid Amir-Hossein Ghazizadeh Hashemi (born 14 April 1971) is an Iranian conservative politician, ENT surgeon, and the current Vice President of Iran and head of Foundation of Martyrs and Veterans Affairs. He represented the Mashhad and Kalat electoral district in the Parliament of Iran from 2008 to 2021.

He was member of the Front of Islamic Revolution Stability and served as the party's spokesperson.

References

Instagram

1971 births
Living people
People from Khorasan
Members of the 8th Islamic Consultative Assembly
Members of the 9th Islamic Consultative Assembly
Members of the 10th Islamic Consultative Assembly
Deputies of Mashhad and Kalat
Front of Islamic Revolution Stability politicians